Sharon Wauchob is an Irish designer who studied at the Central Saint Martins College of Arts and Design in London. Shortly after graduating, Wauchob moved to Paris, where she worked for Koji Tatsuno. Later, she worked as an in-house designer at Louis Vuitton LVMH.

In 1998, Sharon decided to launch her own label under her own name specializing in “alternative” fashion. She shows her collections during the London Fashion Week.

In May 2009 EDUN, the global fashion brand of Ali Hewson and her husband, U2 singer Bono, appointed Sharon Wauchob as the new creative director.

References 

Living people
Irish fashion designers
Irish women fashion designers
Year of birth missing (living people)